Windy Run is a small stream in Arlington County, Virginia. From its source near Lorcom Lane, Windy Run flows on a northeastern course and empties into the Potomac River within the Federal parklands of the George Washington Memorial Parkway.  Windy Run is surrounded predominantly by forests.  It is known by many of the Arlington locals as simply "The Falls".

Parks along Windy Run
Windy Run Park (Arlington County Parks and Recreation)
George Washington Memorial Parkway (US National Park Service)

See also
List of rivers of Virginia

Notes

Rivers of Virginia
Rivers of Arlington County, Virginia
Tributaries of the Potomac River